Liberty Oil is an Australian petroleum distributor and retailer. It is a subsidiary of Viva Energy.

History
Liberty Oil was founded in 1995 by David Goldberger and David Wieland, who had previously founded Solo in 1974, before selling it to Ampol in 1989. Goldberger and Wieland had been subject to a ten year non-compete clause however this was ruled void by the Trade Practices Commission when Ampol merged with Caltex.

In July 2001, Liberty leased 69 of its sites to Woolworths which were rebranded as Woolworths Plus Petrol.
 At this stage it had an 8% market share of the Australian petrol market.

In August 2014, Viva Energy purchased a 50% shareholding, taking full ownership in February 2019. As part of Viva Energy taking full ownership, Liberty Oil Convenience was established as a new joint venture to operate the existing Liberty retail network with Viva Energy owning 50% (non-controlling), and Goldberger and Wieland the balance. Viva will gain rights to fully acquire the joint venture in 2025.

As Viva Energy also operates Shell-branded stations in Australia, Liberty accepts the Shell Card used in Shell stations. , it operates 284 service stations.

References

External links

Liberty Oil
Liberty Oil Convenience

Automotive fuel retailers in Australia
Companies based in Melbourne
Energy companies established in 1995
Retail companies established in 1995
1995 establishments in Australia